Pewamo-Westphalia Community Schools is a rural public school district in Clinton and Ionia Counties, Michigan, United States.

References

Schools in Clinton County, Michigan